HMS Stately was a 64-gun third-rate ship of the line of the Royal Navy, launched on 27 December 1784 at Northam.

French Revolutionary Wars
Sir Richard King took command of Stately at Portsmouth on 24 July 1793, which was reported in The Times newspaper.

In 1798 Stately was at the Cape of Good Hope where she was the venue for the court-martial of Mr. Reid, second mate of the East Indiaman . While they were both on shore, Reid had struck Captain Richard Colnett, captain of King George The court-martial sentenced Reid to two years in the Marshalsea prison. Because Colnett had a letter of marque, King George was a "private man-of-war", and the Navy's Articles of War applied at sea. Had Reid struck Colnett aboard King George, the charge would have been mutiny, for which the penalty would have been death.

The Admiralty had Stately converted for use a troopship in 1799. Because Stately served in the navy's Egyptian campaign (8 March to 2 September 1801), her officers and crew qualified for the clasp "Egypt" to the Naval General Service Medal that the Admiralty issued in 1847 to all surviving claimants.

Napoleonic Wars
The Navy reverted her to a fully armed warship once war resumed after the end of the Treaty of Amiens.

Battle of Zealand Point

On 22 March 1808, Stately and Nassau destroyed the last Danish ship of the line, commanded by Captain C. W. Jessen, in the Battle of Zealand Point.

In 1847 the Admiralty awarded the Naval General Service Medal with clasps "Stately 22 March 1808" and "Nassau 22 March 1808" to any still surviving crew members of those vessels that chose to claim them.

Fate
Stately was broken up in 1814.

Notes, citations, and references
Notes

Citations

References

Lavery, Brian (2003) The Ship of the Line - Volume 1: The development of the battlefleet 1650-1850. Conway Maritime Press. .
Parkinson, C. Northcote (1966; 2013) Trade in Eastern Seas 1793–1813. (Routledge). 

Ships of the line of the Royal Navy
Ardent-class ships of the line
1784 ships